Currie is a suburb of Edinburgh.

Currie may also refer to:

Surname
 Currie (surname), people with the surname Currie

Places
 Currie, Tasmania, the largest settlement on King Island, Australia
 Currie, Minnesota, a US city
 Currie, Nevada, an unincorporated community in the United States
 Currie, New Brunswick
 Currie, North Carolina, an unincorporated community in the United States

Rugby
 Currie RFC, a Scottish rugby club
 Currie Cup, South Africa's premier domestic rugby union competition

See also
 Currier, a person who finishes leather, after the tanning
 Corrie family, a Scottish family also known as the Currie family
 Clan Currie, modern descendants of the MacMhuirich bardic family
 Corrie (disambiguation)
 Curry (disambiguation)
 Curie (disambiguation)